South Friar's Bay is a bay in Saint George Basseterre Parish, Saint Kitts and Nevis. It is one of the two bays that stretch along the coast of the isthmus connecting the Southeast Peninsula, with the rest of the island of Saint Kitts. It is longer than its northern neighbour (North Friar's Bay). At their closest, the two coasts are less than one kilometre apart.

See also
 Geography of Saint Kitts and Nevis

Bays of Saint Kitts and Nevis